The Woodchuck EP is the debut EP from British pop rock band Go:Audio. The title track Woodchuck was released to radio and music television stations in January 2008 to promote the EP release. It received heavy rotation on Kerrang! radio and also became one of the most watched videos on YouTube during that month.

Track listing
 "Woodchuck" - 2:42
 "Forget About It"  - 3:41
 "So Quiet You Were (Alternative Mix)" - 3:51
 "Doesn't Really Matter (The Secret Handshake Remix)" - 3:20

All Tracks Written by: Go:Audio

Personnel
 James Matthews - vocals
 Josh Wilkinson — keyboards, synthesizer
 Zack Wilkinson — guitars
 Andy Booth — drums, percussion

2008 debut EPs
Go:Audio albums
Epic Records EPs